In geometry, the gyroelongated pyramids (also called augmented antiprisms) are an infinite set of polyhedra, constructed by adjoining an  pyramid to an  antiprism.

There are two gyroelongated pyramids that are Johnson solids made from regular triangles and square, and pentagons. A triangular and hexagonal form can be constructed with coplanar faces. Others can be constructed allowing for isosceles triangles.

Forms

See also 
 Gyroelongated bipyramid
 Elongated bipyramid
 Elongated pyramid
 Diminished trapezohedron

References
Norman W. Johnson, "Convex Solids with Regular Faces", Canadian Journal of Mathematics, 18, 1966, pages 169–200. Contains the original enumeration of the 92 solids and the conjecture that there are no others.
  The first proof that there are only 92 Johnson solids.

Pyramids and bipyramids